Bolechowo-Osiedle is a village in the administrative district of Gmina Czerwonak, within Poznań County, Greater Poland Voivodeship, in west-central Poland. It is the seat of Solaris Bus & Coach, a Polish bus, coach, trolleybus and tram manufacturer.

References

Bolechowo-Osiedle